Vandalia is a small unincorporated community in Valley County, Montana, United States.  It was established in 1904 with a post office and a store along the Hi-Line of the Great Northern Railway. The community's chief industry was the manufacture of bricks that were used in public buildings across Montana. Vandalia also shares its namesake with a local dam on the Milk River that diverts water for the Glasgow Irrigation District.

Climate
According to the Köppen Climate Classification system, Vandalia has a semi-arid climate, abbreviated "BSk" on climate maps.

Population

References

Unincorporated communities in Valley County, Montana
Unincorporated communities in Montana
Ghost towns in Montana